Hewligan’s Haircut is a comic series created by Peter Milligan and Jamie Hewlett that appeared in 2000 AD in 1990. The title character’s name is a blend of Hewlett and Milligan, and a play on "hooligan".

The series is a surreal comedy. Hewligan, an inmate of an insane asylum, gives himself a haircut with a pair of plastic scissors only for an inexplicable hole to appear in his huge pompadour, causing an apocalyptic bending of reality. The plot takes the form of a madcap interdimensional quest for Hewligan and his reality-warping companion Scarlet O’Gasmeter to set things straight.

Writing about Hewligan’s Haircut for Time, Douglas Wolk remarks that as with “Milligan’s other comics, the idea of madness is a license to pour anything and everything onto the page”. Wolk cites MAD comics as a major antecedent of Hewlett’s artwork, which incorporates a self-conscious mishmash of techniques and reference points, including fanzines, collage, Dada, cubism and pop art.

Collected Editions 
 Classic 2000 AD #11, 1996
 Hewligan's Haircut: A Story in Eight Partings (2000 AD Books, 1991)
 Hewligan's Haircut (Rebellion, 2003)

External links 
 The 2000 AD ABC #46: Hewligan's Haircut at YouTube

References 

2000 AD comic strips
2000 AD characters
Comics characters introduced in 1990
Comics by Peter Milligan
Works about mental health